The Pont de Recouvrance is a vertical-lift bridge in Brest, France, across the river Penfeld.  Opened on 17 July 1954, it was the largest vertical-lift bridge in Europe until the opening of the Rouen Pont Gustave-Flaubert in 2008.  It links the bottom of the rue de Siam to the quartier de Recouvrance, replacing a swing bridge (the pont National) destroyed by Allied bombardment in 1944.

Each pylon is 70m high, and the 525-tonne lift span is 88m long.

Trolley bus 
The bridge was crossed by trolleybuses from its opening in 1954 until the closure of the Brest trolleybus system, in 1970.

Trams 

The lift span was renovated in 2011 to allow the new tram line to cross the bridge.  The tram line opened by July 2012.

References

Sources 
Le pont levant de Brest, brochure edited by La Télémécanique Électrique (1954 ?)

External links 

 Structurae

Buildings and structures in Brest, France
Bridges in France
Vertical lift bridges
Transport in Brittany